Designed by Böhler, the M18 ‘Feldkanone’ field gun was a mobile artillery piece firing a standard shell chambered in 76.5 x 233mm.

Being Austro-Hungarian in origin— designed in 1917, the gun initially faced competition with Skoda, of which Böhler had taken the lead with its accuracy with the inclusion of a longer barrel, allowing for increased mission operation scale.

Despite the M18’s triumph, the M17 field gun continued to serve alongside its cousin during the two World Wars.

With an effective range of 10,500 meters (10.5km), an estimated rate of fire of 10-15 rounds per minute, and a projectile speed of 500m/s, the field gun found itself extensive use in trench warfare and artillery bombardment.

Its post-war service is unclear, serving in small numbers with the Austrian Army, with Germany not placing it into service following the Anschluss due to it using non-standard ammunition.  A copy was also manufactured in China as the "Type 14 77mm" from 1925. The M 18 was also modified by the Hungarians for installation as the main armament in their indigenous 41M Turán tank.

The carriage of the M 18 had a bent axle which allowed the whole carriage to traverse, with it having a narrow set of wheels for mountain use. For transport it broke down into three pieces, to be carried on carts.

Notes

References 
 Gander, Terry and Chamberlain, Peter. Weapons of the Third Reich: An Encyclopedic Survey of All Small Arms, Artillery and Special Weapons of the German Land Forces 1939-1945. New York: Doubleday, 1979 
 Ortner, M. Christian. The Austro-Hungarian Artillery From 1867 to 1918: Technology, Organization, and Tactics. Vienna, Verlag Militaria, 2007 
 Chamberlain, Peter and Gander, Terry. Light and Medium Field Artillery. New York, Arco
 http://www.passioncompassion1418.com/Canons/Eng_AfficheCanonGET.php?IdCanonAffiche=1091

World War I guns
World War I artillery of Austria-Hungary
World War II field artillery
World War II weapons of China
83 mm artillery